The Melk Formation is a geologic formation in Austria. It preserves fossils dating back to the Paleogene period.

See also 
 List of fossiliferous stratigraphic units in Austria

References

External links 
 

Geologic formations of Austria
Oligocene Series of Europe
Miocene Series of Europe
Aquitanian (stage)
Chattian Stage
Neogene Austria
Paleogene Austria
Sandstone formations
Paleontology in Austria